Mawlā (plural mawālī ), is a polysemous Arabic word, whose meaning varied in different periods and contexts. 

Before the Islamic prophet Muhammad, the term originally applied to any form of tribal association. 

In the Quran and hadiths it is used in a number of senses, including 'Lord', 'guardian', 'trustee', and 'helper'. 

After Muhammad's death, this institution was adapted by the Umayyad dynasty to incorporate new converts to Islam into Arab-Muslim society and the word mawali gained currency as an appellation for converted non-Arab Muslims in the early Islamic caliphates.

Etymology 
The word mawla is derived from the root   w-l-y , meaning "to be close to", "to be friends with", or "to have power over". Mawla can have reciprocal meanings, depending on whether it is used in the active or passive voice: "master" or "slave/freedman", "patron" or "client", "uncle" or "nephew", or simply friend. Originally, mawāli were clients of an Arab tribe, but with the advent of Islam, the term came to refer to non-Arab Muslims and other client allies of the Muslim community.

History 

The term originated in the pre-Islamic Arabia to refer to a politically-active class of slaves and freedmen, Daniel Pipes argued that the first indication of the Mamluk military class were rooted from the practice of early Muslims such as Zubayr ibn al-Awwam and Uthman ibn Affan of owning massive number of slaves and practice of this Islamic manumission of slaves. The Zubayrids army under Abd Allah ibn al-Zubayr, son of Zubayr, has practiced these freed slave retainers during the second civil war.

Later it gained more prominence during Umayyad Caliphate, as many non-Arab subjects converted to Islam. The influx of non-Arab converts to Islam created a new difficulty in incorporating them into tribal Arab society. The solution appeared to be the creation of a contract, a wala', through which the non-Arab Muslims acquired an Arab patron (mawla). They continued to pay a similar tax that was required from the people of the book and were generally excluded from government and the military until the end of the Umayyad Caliphate. In Khorasan and Persia, the Arabs held most of the higher positions in the armed forces and in the upper echelons of government.

The Abbasid Revolution in 750 CE challenged the political and social privileges held so far by the Arabs. The key figure in this revolution was Abu Muslim Khorasani. He was a Persian, born in Isfahan and therefore had impeccable credentials of birth with the exploited Persian majority. The legacy of Umayyad excesses had created extreme bitterness among the local population. Unfair taxation had fostered dislike of the Arabs among the Persians. Under the Abbasid rulers of the 9th century, the non-Arab converts comprised an important part of the army. The institution of wala' as a requirement to enter Muslim society ceased to exist after the fall of the Umayyads, as the Abbasids favoured a universal interpretation of Islam that was not the exclusive religion of the Arab elite. However, the rise to political power of non-Arab ethnic groups eventually restricted the power of the Abbasid caliph in Baghdad, as Persian, Turkic and Berber Muslims began to form independent sultanates. 

Abu Hanifa was the founder of the Hanafi school of jurisprudence within Sunni Islam and lived through the Abbasid Revolution. He famously stated in one of his dictums: "The belief of a newly converted Turk is the same as that of an Arab from Hejaz." 

However, this institution continued in the Abbasid period on a much smaller scale with the formation of armies entirely composed of non-Muslim slaves in the service of the Caliph. These slaves were considered to be the mawali of the Caliph and were thus in theory more loyal to the Caliph than free Muslim troops. This practice persisted throughout Islamic history through to the Ottoman period, who formed their own corps of non-Muslim slave troops known as the Janissaries.

Ghadir Khumm 
The word "Mawla" is regarded as a considerable word in the Ghadir Khumm event (regarding the sentence which was declared by the Islamic prophet Muhammad in Islam about Ali, when he said: "For whoever I am his mawla, 'Ali is his mawla."). There have been mentioned meanings for this use of the word "mawla", including leader, administrator, friend, Lord, owner, master, slave, follower, helper, one who has more right in something, wali, an ally, etc. Shias argue that in the context of the sermon (Ghadir Khumm), Muhammad intended that the word "mawla" to be taken as "leader". They therefore see this to be the official designation of Ali as the prophet's successor.

See also 

 Ajam
 Dhimmi
 Jizyah
 Mawlānā
 Mullah
 Shu'ubiyyah
 Umm walad
 Walayah
 Wilayah

Notes

References 
 Hourani, Albert. A History of the Arab People. Chapter 1. 
 Mas'udi. The Meadows of Gold. Trans. and eds. Paul Lunde and Caroline Stone.

Further reading 
 Conversion and Poll-Tax in Early Islam, D.C. Dennett, Cambridge 1950.
 The Encyclopaedia of Islam, second edition.
 Slaves on Horses, P. Crone, Cambridge 1980.
 Roman, Provincial and Islamic Law: The Origins of the Islamic Patronate, P. Crone, Cambridge University Press, 2002.
 Patronate And Patronage in Early And Classical Islam, M. Bernards, J. Nawas, Brill, 2005.
 ''Mawlas: Freed slaves and converts in early Islam'', Daniel Pipes, in: Slavery & Abolition, 1980, 1:2, 132–177

Archaic words and phrases
Islamic terminology
Ethno-cultural designations
Religion and race
Arabic words and phrases
Anti-Iranian sentiments
Racism in the Arab world
Shia Islam
Abbasid Revolution